The 1914 Boston College football team was an American football team that represented Boston College as an independent during the 1914 college football season. Led by first-year head coach Stephen Mahoney, Boston College compiled a record of 5–4.

Schedule

References

Boston College
Boston College Eagles football seasons
Boston College football
1910s in Boston